The Journey Home (originally titled Midnight Sun) is a 2014 Canadian-Italian family adventure-drama film starring Dakota Goyo, Goran Višnjić, and Bridget Moynahan, written by Hugh Hudson, directed by Roger Spottiswoode and Brando Quilici. Filmed on location in Ontario and Manitoba, Canada, it follows a local teenager (Goyo), who works to reunite a lost polar bear cub with its mother. It premiered in November 2014, and received generally mixed-to-positive reviews.

Plot
A local teenager defies nature to reunite an abandoned polar bear cub with its mother in the ice fields of Northern Canada.

Cast 
 Dakota Goyo - Luke
 Goran Višnjić - Muktuk
 Bridget Moynahan - Luke's Mom
 Kendra Timmins - Abbie
 Russell Yuen - Asian Doctor
 Duane Murray - Jake Murdoch
Black Bear - Polar Bear

References

External links
 
 
 

Canadian children's adventure films
2010s children's adventure films
English-language Canadian films
English-language Italian films
2014 films
Films directed by Roger Spottiswoode
Entertainment One films
Films about polar bears
Films shot in Sault Ste. Marie, Ontario
Films shot in Manitoba
2010s English-language films
2010s Canadian films